Charlevoix is a former provincial electoral district in the Capitale-Nationale region of Quebec, Canada, which elected members to the National Assembly of Quebec. As of its final election, it included the municipalities of La Malbaie, Saint-Siméon, Baie-Saint-Paul and Baie-Sainte-Catherine.

It was created for the 1867 election (and an electoral district of that name existed earlier in the Legislative Assembly of the Province of Canada). Its final election was in 1908. It disappeared in the 1912 election and its successor electoral district was Charlevoix-Saguenay.

It was recreated for the 1948 election and its final election was in 2008.  It disappeared again in the 2012 election, and its successor electoral district was Charlevoix–Côte-de-Beaupré.

Members of the Legislative Assembly / National Assembly
 Léon-Charles Clément, Conservative (1867–1871)
 Adolphe Gagnon, Liberal (1871–1875)
 Onésime Gauthier, Conservative (1875–1886)
 Joseph Morin, Liberal (1886–1897)
 Pierre D'Auteuil, Conservative (1897–1900)
 Joseph Morin, Liberal (1900–1904)
 Pierre D'Auteuil, Conservative (1904–1912)
 did not exist (1912–1948), see Charlevoix-Saguenay
 Arthur Leclerc, Union Nationale (1948–1962)
 Raymond Mailloux, Liberal (1962–1985)
 Daniel Bradet, Liberal (1985–1994)
 Rosaire Bertrand, Parti Québécois (1994–2007)
 Pauline Marois, Parti Québécois (2007–2012)

Election results

 
|Liberal
|Jean Luc Simard
|align="right"|6,241
|align="right"|31.01
|align="right"|-

|No designation
|Jean-Michel Harvey
|align="right"|150
|align="right"|0.75
|align="right"|-

|-

|-

|-

|Independent
|Claude Gagnon
|align="right"|77
|align="right"|0.40
|align="right"|-
|-

|Independent
|Daniel Laforest
|align="right"|64
|align="right"|0.33
|align="right"|-
|-

|Republic of Quebec
|François Robert Lemire
|align="right"|52
|align="right"|0.27
|align="right"|-
|}

|-
 
|Liberal
|Jean-Guy Bouchard
|align="right"|6,541
|align="right"|27.08
|align="right"|-10.63
|-

|}
* Increase is from UFP

|-
 
|Liberal
|Denis Lavoie
|align="right"|8,758
|align="right"|37.71
|align="right"|+3.19

|-

|-

|Independent
|Gabriel Tremblay
|align="right"|105
|align="right"|0.45
|align="right"|-0.21
|-

|}

|-
 
|Liberal
|Claire Gagnon
|align="right"|8,322
|align="right"|34.52
|align="right"|-4.56

|-
 
|Socialist Democracy
|Guillaume Tremblay
|align="right"|183
|align="right"|0.76
|align="right"|-
|-

|Independent
|Gabriel Tremblay
|align="right"|158
|align="right"|0.66
|align="right"|-
|}

|-
 
|Liberal
|Daniel Bradet
|align="right"|8,986
|align="right"|39.08
|align="right"|-15.05
|-

|Independent
|Guy Fontaine
|align="right"|1,915
|align="right"|8.33
|align="right"|-
|}

|-
 
|Liberal
|Daniel Bradet
|align="right"|11,816
|align="right"|54.13
|align="right"|-7.00

|}

|-
 
|Liberal
|Daniel Bradet
|align="right"|14,847
|align="right"|61.13
|align="right"|+10.48

|-
 
|New Democrat
|Robert Vigneault
|align="right"|634
|align="right"|2.61
|align="right"|-
|}

|-
 
|Liberal
|Raymond Mailloux
|align="right"|12,712
|align="right"|50.65
|align="right"|-3.93

|-

|}

|-
 
|Liberal
|Raymond Mailloux
|align="right"|12,419
|align="right"|54.58
|align="right"|-9.33

|-

|-

|}

References

External links
Information
 Elections Quebec

Election results
 Election results (National Assembly)
 Election results (Elections Quebec)

Maps
 2001 map (Flash)
2001–2011 changes (Flash)
1992–2001 changes (Flash) 
 Electoral map of Capitale-Nationale region (as of 2001)
 Quebec electoral map, 2001

Baie-Saint-Paul
Former provincial electoral districts of Quebec